Malpolon monspessulanus, commonly known as the Montpellier snake, is a species of mildly venomous rear-fanged snake.

Geographic range
It is very common in Spain, Portugal and Northwest Africa, being also present in the southern Mediterranean coast of France. The snake's specific name, monspessulanus,  is a Latinized form of Montpellier, a city in southern France.

Description

Behavior and diet
It is active during the day and mainly feeds on lizards.

Venom
Although it is venomous, only a few cases of envenomation of humans are known, one of which occurred when a finger was inserted into the snake's mouth. The Montpellier snake is not a dangerous snake for humans. The rear fangs reduce the possibility of venom injection, and the venom is of low toxicity. Venom injections are possible in bites of big individuals. The venom is not very dangerous; symptomatic treatment suffices to treat an envenomation. The unthreatening nature of the snake, along with its relatively mild persecution by man, has made it one of the most common species throughout its range, even in areas occupied by humans.

Evolution
Genetic evidence suggests that the species originated in the Maghreb, migrating into southwestern Europe between 83,000 and 168,000 years ago and into southeastern Europe and western Asia at an earlier time. It is most closely related to the North African and Arabian species Malpolon moilensis and to a fossil species from the Pliocene of Spain, Malpolon mlynarskii, with which it forms the genus Malpolon. Malpolon has a good fossil record, dating back to the Pliocene in both southwestern Europe and northern Africa, but many of the fossils are isolated vertebrae, which are difficult to assign to species.

Subspecies
There are three major subspecies of M. monspessulanus throughout its Mediterranean range. There is a deep genetic divergence between the western subspecies, M. m. monspessulanus, and the two eastern subspecies, M. m. insignitus and M. m. fuscus, leading to a proposal to recognize the eastern form as a distinct species, M. insignitus. These two groups are estimated to have split about 3.5 to 6 million years ago. A fourth subspecies, M. m. saharatlanticus, was described in 2006.

M. m. monspessulanus
M. m. monspessulanus occurs in southwestern Europe (Spain, Portugal, southern France and northwestern Italy) and the western Maghreb, where it is found in Morocco and coastal Algeria, east to Algiers. On the mid-body, there are usually 19 dorsal scale rows and a dark 'saddle' on the foreparts is present in males. M. m. monspessulanus possesses a single median process on its basioccipital bone that forms a strong spur, directed backwards; in the two eastern subspecies, two processes or indistinct hardened pieces of bones are present. There is little genetic or morphological differentiation between North African and European populations, suggesting a recent arrival in Europe.

M. m. fuscus
M. m. fuscus is found in southeastern Europe and Turkey through northern Iraq and western Iran. It differs from M. m. insignitus in having only 17 dorsal scale rows on its mid-body.

M. m. saharatlanticus
Another subspecies, M. m. saharatlanticus, lives in the region from Bouizakarne in Morocco to Dakhla in the Western Sahara, inland to Aoulouz and Tafraoute.

Delimitation issues
Forms of M. monspessulanus found in the more arid parts of Syria, Jordan, and Iraq are sometimes hard to classify because they have either 17 or 19 scale rows, resembling both M. m. fuscus and M. m. insignitus.

Human interaction
The animal is not threatened by its interactions with humans and is assessed as "Least Concern", but it is often killed by cars and farmers, and is sometimes used by snake charmers and sold as curio. Even in areas affected by humans, the population is stable and in some areas growing. It is found in a number of protected areas.

References

Further reading
Arnold EN, Burton JA. 1978. A Field Guide to the Reptiles and Amphibians of Britain and Europe. London: Collins. 272 pp. + Plates 1-40. . (Malpolon monspesulanus, pp. 190–191 + Plate 34 + Map 103 on p. 265).
Hermann J. 1804. Observationes zoologicae quibus novae complures, aliaeque animalium species describuntur et illustrantur. Paris: Amandum Koenig. viii + 332 pp. (Coluber monspessulanus, p. 283). (in Latin).

External links

Malpolon monspessulanus, die Eidechsennatter

Psammophiidae
Reptiles described in 1804
Taxa named by Johann Hermann
Reptiles of Europe
Snakes of Asia
Snakes of Africa